Denis Mikhaylovich Chushyalov (born 26 August 1992) is a Russian football midfielder. He plays for FC Zenit-Izhevsk.

Club career
He made his debut in the Russian Second Division for FC KAMAZ Naberezhnye Chelny on 21 July 2012 in a game against FC Spartak Yoshkar-Ola. He made his Russian Football National League debut for KAMAZ on 11 July 2015 in a game against FC Gazovik Orenburg.

References

External links
 
 
 

1992 births
Living people
Russian footballers
Association football midfielders
FC KAMAZ Naberezhnye Chelny players
FC Zenit-Izhevsk players
FC Zvezda Perm players
Russian First League players
Russian Second League players